The Old Dutch Church of Sleepy Hollow, listed on the National Register of Historic Places as Dutch Reformed Church (Sleepy Hollow), is a 17th-century stone church located on Albany Post Road (U.S. Route 9) in Sleepy Hollow, New York, United States. It and its three-acre (1.2 ha) churchyard feature prominently in Washington Irving's 1820 short story "The Legend of Sleepy Hollow". The churchyard is often confused with the contiguous but separate Sleepy Hollow Cemetery.

It is the second oldest extant church and the 15th oldest extant building in the state of New York, renovated after an 1837 fire. Some of those renovations were reversed 60 years later, and further work was done in 1960. It was listed on the Register in 1966, among the earliest properties so recognized. It had already been designated a National Historic Landmark in 1961. It is still the property of the Reformed Church of the Tarrytowns, which holds summer services there, as well as on special occasions such as Christmas Eve.

Building
The building was designed and funded by Frederick Philipse I, Lord of Philipse Manor, a wealthy merchant trader and landowner. It is located on the east side of Albany Post Road, opposite the Devries Road intersection, just north of downtown Sleepy Hollow. The neighborhoods to the west are residential. A wooded area to the southeast buffers the church from residential areas in that direction. Approximately 300 ft (100 m) to the south is the mill pond at Philipsburg Manor House, another National Historic Landmark. The churchyard and Sleepy Hollow Cemetery, itself listed on the Register, are to the north.

The structure is rectangular, with a three-sided projecting rear apse on the east end. It has two-foot–thick (60 cm) fieldstone walls. They give way to clapboard above the roofline, within the fields of the Flemish-style gambrel roof, with its lower segments flaring outward like a bell. On the west end of the roof is an octagonal wooden open belfry. Within it is the original bell, with an engraved verse from Romans 8:31, "Si Deus Pro Nobis, Quis Contras Nos?" ("If God be for us, who can be against us") and "VF", Philipse's initials. The latter monogram is also on the wrought iron weathervane atop the belfry.

To the west a stone retaining wall raises the church above grade level. A few shrubs flank the stone steps that lead up to the main entrance, paneled wooden double doors recessed within a Gothic archway. Above it is a glass transom with curved, intersecting muntins. It is set within a brick surround. The north and south side elevations have double-hung sash windows, as do the two side facets of the apse. At the roofline is a molded wooden cornice.

The interior has its wooden pews, with two side aisles, arranged so all can focus on the pulpit. The pulpit is located on a raised platform in the rear, directly opposite the main entrance. A balustrade with turned wooden posts, open at the aisles, sets the platform off from the rest of the wide-planked floor. Behind it is a table, with a lectern on the north and an enclosed pew along the south side. The ornate wooden pulpit is raised further above the table level; access is provided by a short spiral stair. A pipe organ is located at the rear.

History
Frederick Philipse I, Lord of Philipse Manor, owned the vast stretch of land spanning from Spuyten Duyvil in the Bronx to the Croton River. After swearing allegiance and later being granted his Manorship from the English, he chose to establish his country seat at what was then known as North Tarrytown, where the Pocantico River flowed into the Hudson River. A small community had already been established there when he arrived in 1683, with 50 burials in the small cemetery. He built the first church for them at the southern end of the cemetery.

Philipse's wife, Margaret Hardenbroek DeVries Philipse died in 1691, and he soon remarried. His second wife,  Catharine Van Cortlandt Derval, urged him to build a more permanent stone church for his tenants, and later in the decade he obliged her, being its architect, financier,  and aid in its construction (said to have built the pulpit with his own hands). A marble tablet in front of the church gives its completion date as 1699. The tablet was placed in the 19th century, however, and it is seen as more likely that the church was finished by 1697. The congregation was organized that year, the same year the first pastor began serving.

The early history of the church and its members was recorded by Dirck Storm, in his book Het Notite Boeck der Christelyckes Kercke op de Manner of Philips Burgh. It continued to serve as the church of Philipse Manor through the Revolution, when the family's lands were confiscated by the state for siding with the Crown. At that time the special pews for the Lord of the Manor were removed and the plain oak benches for the tenants were replaced with pine pews.

Thereafter it continued without the patronage. Washington Irving, whose Sunnyside estate was a few miles to the south, made the church famous when he gave it prominent mention in his early 19th-century Halloween short story "The Legend of Sleepy Hollow" as both a setting and a site connected with the Headless Horseman. Irving later gave yellow bricks from the church to outline the construction date on the wall above the door at Bolton Priory in Pelham Manor, New York.

In 1837 a fire damaged the church. During the repairs some significant changes were made to the building. The main entrance was moved from the south facade to its current location on the west, the windows and door entry were changed to the Gothic arches then in style and given brick surrounds. Inside, the north gallery was removed and the west one enlarged. The original ceiling beams and pulpit were replaced.

Sixty years later the church was renovated again for its bicentennial. That work reversed the 1837 renovations by restoring the original ceiling and reproducing the original pulpit. The Tarrytowns had grown through the 19th century, and a branch church had been built in Tarrytown to minister to the expanded congregation. Eventually that church became the main church, and the original building was used only for special occasions, a practice that continued until the most recent renovation in the 1990s. Currently, worship services are held from June through September.

Notable burials

 Wolfert Acker (1667–1753), former deacon of the church, Collector of Philipsburg Manor, and subject of Washington Irving's Wofert's Roost. His wife Maretje Sibouts and his brother Jan Acker, the church's first deacon, was also buried here (supposedly in the church).
 William Paulding Jr. (1770–1854), U.S. Representative from New York and mayor of New York City
 Frederick Philipse (1626–1702) – formerly held 52,000 acres (210 km²) of land along the Hudson River, Philipsburg Manor; builder of the church of Sleepy Hollow
 Dirck Storm (1630–1715) – author of Het Notite Boeck der Christelyckes Kercke op de Manner of Philips Burgh, a book about the early years of the Old Dutch Church.  He also served as Town Clerk in the early years of many New Amsterdam communities, including New Lots, Flatbush and Bedford, as well as Tax Collector for Frederick Philipse.
 Catriena Ecker Van Tessel – a possible model for Katrina in "The Legend of Sleepy Hollow" and her Revolutionary War hero husband Petrus Van Tessel
Samuel Youngs (1760–1839) – Friend of Washington Irving and one of several possible models for the character of Ichabod Crane of the Legend of Sleepy Hollow. His remains were later removed to Ossining's Dale Cemetery.

See also
Historic Hudson Valley
 List of National Historic Landmarks in New York
 List of the oldest buildings in New York
 National Register of Historic Places listings in northern Westchester County, New York
 Oldest churches in the United States

References

External links

The Reformed Church of the Tarrytowns

 Philipsburg Manor House

Cemeteries in Westchester County, New York
Churches in Westchester County, New York
Former Dutch Reformed churches in New York (state)
Historic American Buildings Survey in New York (state)
National Historic Landmarks in New York (state)
National Register of Historic Places in Westchester County, New York
New Netherland
Churches on the National Register of Historic Places in New York (state)
Protestant Reformed cemeteries
Reformed Church in America churches in New York (state)
Sleepy Hollow, New York
Stone churches in New York (state)
U.S. Route 9
1697 establishments in the Province of New York
17th-century churches in the United States
Churches completed in 1697
Washington Irving